Mārcis Auziņš (born 11 January 1956) is a Latvian physicist. From 2007 to 2015 he served as the rector of the University of Latvia. In 1998, Auziņš was also elected a member of the Latvian Academy of Sciences. In 2005 he was a visiting Miller professor at University of California, Berkeley

Education 
 University of Latvia (Faculty of Mathematics and Physics) 1979
 Dr.phys (cand. Phys. Math. Sciences), Saint Petersburg State University, 1986
 Dr. habil. phys., University of Latvia, 1995

References

External links 

 Personal page at the University of Latvia

1956 births
Latvian physicists
Rectors of universities in Latvia
Scientists from Riga
Living people
Recipients of the Order of the Cross of Terra Mariana, 3rd Class
University of Latvia alumni
Academic staff of the University of Latvia